Drewsteignton is a village, civil parish and former manor within the administrative area of West Devon, England, also lying within the Dartmoor National Park. Visitor attractions in the area include the village centre itself, nearby Castle Drogo, and Fingle Bridge. The population of the ward at the 2011 census was 1,616.

History
Settlement in the area dates back to the Neolithic period. Spinsters' Rock at Shilston, within the parish, is a Neolithic chambered tomb dating from around 3000 BC, and there are stone circles of similar date in the area. Later, an Iron Age hill fort, now known as Prestonbury Castle, was developed on the end of a prominent ridge.

Manor
The manor of Taintone (meaning in Anglo-Saxon "a settlement beside the (River) Teign") is listed in the Domesday Book of 1086 as the 107th of the 176 Devon landholdings of Baldwin the Sheriff, otherwise known as Baldwin FitzGilbert and Baldwin de Meulles. He held it in demesne. He was William the Conqueror's Sheriff of Devon and held lands granted to him personally by that king in Devon which comprised the feudal barony of Okehampton, including Taintone. In the reign of King Henry II (1154-1189) it was held by a certain "Drew", also known in Anglo-Norman French as Drew de Teignton, Latinized to Drogo, from whom the manor derived its distinguishing suffix. However, by 1242 it had passed from the Drew family and was held by the Daubernon (or Dabernon) family. Later it passed to the Carew family of Antony in Cornwall and at some time before 1810 was sold-off piecemeal by Reginald Pole-Carew (d.1835).

In later years a myth developed, encouraged by the presence of the archaeological remains, that the "Drew" part of the name derived from the presence of druids, but there is no evidence to support this.

In mediaeval times, the village was relatively prosperous. It was important as a wool producing area, and there were also limestone quarries and a small tin mine.  The village was a stopping place on the old road from Exeter to Okehampton. Much of the village building is of granite, as is Fingle Bridge, over the Teign, which was built in the 16th or 17th century.
Historically the village formed part of Wonford Hundred.

The parish church of Holy Trinity dates mostly from the 15th century, with some later rebuilding.  
Elias Tozer (1825–73) visited the village when they were ringing the church bells, They be often ringing, sir,' observed an old man to me; and he continued: '
The village square adjoining the church may date from the original formation of the settlement. Census information indicates that Drewsteignton underwent prolonged depopulation through the 19th century, and many of its buildings have remained largely unchanged since then.  The centre was designated as a conservation area in 1972.

The nearby but now disused quarry was worked extensively in the 18th and into the 19th century. Limestone was extracted for road-building as well as construction. A number of workers were employed and seven cottages, bakery and blacksmith's workshop made up Wynbeam Cross and Kiln Village to the south of the workings. Various original lime kilns are in a degraded state but remain visible on site. Limestone extraction ended in 1906-9, and one of the two main pits was filled with water. Further commercial activity at the site took place in the later 20th century, finally ending in 1991.

Among the village buildings is the Drewe Arms, a pub retaining some historic features.  Previously known as The Druids' Arms, the name was changed in the 1920s when Julius Drewe built Castle Drogo, his family home. The pub was managed by Mabel Mudge, originally with her husband, from 1919 until 1994 when she retired at the age of 99, the oldest pub landlady in the country.

Sculptor Peter Randall-Page lives nearby, and a number of his works can be viewed in the area, including the bench, table and bird bath in the village's community garden.

See also
Castle Drogo

References

External links

Photos of Drewsteignton
Wiki Voyage - Drewsteignton

Villages in Devon
Dartmoor